Anupshahr is a major village located in Bhadra, Rajasthan tehsil, Hanumangarh District, India. It belongs to Bikaner division. It is popular as name "Nopra". It is an Historical village located some 24  km south-west of Bhadra and around 134 km off to Hanumangarh.It also located at border of Hanumangarh District. Anupshahr can be reached from Anupshahr, the nearest railway station. It is 50 km off National Highway NH-52 and 285 km from State capital Jaipur. It is 230 km from national capital New Delhi.

Demographics

According to 2011 Census of India, Anupshahr Town had a population of 4,177, of which male and female are 2142 and 2035 respectively. The sex ratio was 950 and 14.17% were under six years of age. The effective literacy rate was 69.26%, with male literacy at 79.29% and female literacy at 58.71%.

Climate

Education 
The village has One Government Higher Secondary School for boys and girls, one Government Primary School.
There are also a number of Non-Government Schools for Middle, and Secondary Education.

 Govt. Sr. Secondary School, Anupshahr
 Govt. Balika Secondary School, Anupshahr (Girls)
 Govt. upper Primary School, ward Number 1 Anupshahr
 Govt. primary school Bhata wala johar, Anupshahr
 R.L. memo. school, Anupshahr 
 S.D. Model sr. sec. school, Anupshahr 
 Sarswati vidhya mandir school, Anupshahr

References

Villages in Hanumangarh district